The 1991 Army Cadets football team was an American football team that represented the United States Military Academy in the 1991 NCAA Division I-A football season. In their first season under head coach Bob Sutton, the Cadets compiled a 4–7 record and were outscored by their opponents by a combined total of 226 to 196.  In the annual Army–Navy Game, the Cadets lost to Navy, 24–3.

Schedule

Personnel

Season summary

Navy

References

Army
Army Black Knights football seasons
Army Cadets football